Goksu Turkdogan (born 15 April 1985) is a Turkish professional footballer who plays for an amateur side İnegöl Kafkas Gençlikspor.

References

External links

1985 births
People from Üsküdar
Footballers from Istanbul
Living people
Turkish footballers
Association football forwards
Pendikspor footballers
Sarıyer S.K. footballers
Elazığspor footballers
Kayseri Erciyesspor footballers
Ankaraspor footballers
Altınordu F.K. players
Samsunspor footballers
Tuzlaspor players
Süper Lig players
TFF First League players
TFF Second League players